A floating dock, floating pier or floating jetty is a platform or ramp supported by pontoons. It is usually joined to the shore with a gangway. The pier is usually held in place by vertical poles referred to as pilings, which are embedded in the seafloor or by anchored cables.

In shipbuilding and ship operations the term floating dock refers to a floating drydock.

Frequently used in marinas, this type of pier maintains a fixed vertical relationship to watercraft secured to it, independent of tidal, river or lake elevation.

See also
Floating dry dock

Coastal construction